Home Sweet Home may refer to:

Film 
 Home, Sweet Home (1914 film), a film about the life of John Howard Payne
 Home Sweet Home (1917 film), a British silent film
 Home Sweet Home (1926 film), a silent film drama
 Home, Sweet Home (1933 film), a British film starring Richard Cooper
 Home Sweet Home (1945 film), a British comedy film starring Frank Randle
 Home Sweet Home (1970 film), a Taiwanese film awarded a Golden Horse Award for Best Feature Film
 Home Sweet Home (1973 film), a Belgian film directed by Benoît Lamy
 Home Sweet Home (1981 film), a slasher film starring Jake Steinfeld
 Home Sweet Home (1982 film), a Mike Leigh television film
 Home Sweet Home (2005 film), a Hong Kong horror film
 Home Sweet Home (2013 film), a Canadian horror film starring Meghan Heffern
 Home Sweet Home (2014 film), a 2014 Indian Konkani language comedy film
 Home Sweet Home 2, a 2015 Indian Konkani language film
 Home Sweet Home (2016 film), a Kosovan film

Music 
 Home Sweet Home Records

Songs 
 "Home! Sweet Home!", an 1823 song by Henry Bishop and John Howard Payne
 "Home Sweet Home" (Mötley Crüe song), 1985
 "Home Sweet Home" (The Farm song), 2011
 "Home Sweet Home", a song by Dennis Robbins
 "Home Sweet Home", a song by Yuki

Albums 
 Home Sweet Home (Kano album)
 Home Sweet Home (Katherine Jenkins album), 2014
 Home Sweet Home, a 1970 solo album by American singer-songwriter Terry Manning
 Home Sweet Home, a 1993 album by American hip-hop group House of Krazees

Television 
 Home Sweet Home (Australian TV series), a 1980 Australian sitcom
 Home Sweet Home (2010 TV series), a 2010 South Korean drama
 Home Sweet Home (2013 TV series), a 2013 Philippine drama
 Home Sweet Home (American TV series), a 2021 America reality social experiment series
 Home Sweet Home (Ghanaian TV series), an English-language Ghanaian family television drama series
 "Home Sweet Home" (The Walking Dead), a 2021 episode of The Walking Dead
 "Home Sweet Home", an episode of the TV series Alvin and the Chipmunks

Other uses
 Home Sweet Home (2007 video game), a 2007/2008 game for PC and WiiWare
 Home Sweet Home (2017 video game), a 2017 horror game
 Home Sweet Home, a historic house and museum in East Hampton Village District, New York
 Home Sweet Home, a novel by Jeanne Betancourt

See also 
 "Home Sweet Home/Bittersweet Symphony", a 2005 medley by Limp Bizkit
 Home Sweet Homer (musical), a notorious Broadway flop
 "Home Sweet Homeless", an episode of the TV series The Care Bears
 "Home Sweet Homes", an episode of the TV series Barney & Friends